Chauncey Brewster Tinker (October 22, 1876 – March 10, 1963) was a scholar of English Literature and Sterling Professor at Yale University.

Early life
Tinker was born on October 22, 1876, in Auburn, Maine to Anson Phelps Tinker, a Yale graduate and minister, and Martha White. He attended East Denver High School, then went to Yale to receive a BA (1899), MA (1900), and PhD (1902), after which he joined the school's faculty.

Career
In 1923, Tinker was made Sterling Professor of English Literature, and remained at the university until 1945.

At Yale, Tinker was instrumental in establishing a rare books collection, of which he was named the curator in 1931, and in founding the Elizabethan Club. His early work, completed in collaboration with Albert Stanburrough Cook, focused on Old English literature, while the remainder of his career focused on eighteenth century English literary scholarship, including that of Samuel Johnson and his principal biographer, James Boswell.

As a faculty member, Tinker was known as an opponent of New Criticism.

In his 2019 book, Possessed by Memory, Harold Bloom describes Tinker as “a scholar noted for the appearance of stigmata upon him during Passion Week.”

Death
Tinker died on March 10, 1963, and is buried at Grove Street Cemetery in New Haven, Connecticut.

Selected publications

See also
Frederick W. Hilles

References

External links
 
Works by or about Chauncey Brewster Tinker at the Internet Archive
Chauncey Brewster Tinker Letters and Manuscripts. General Collection, Beinecke Rare Book and Manuscript Library, Yale University.
Chauncey Brewster Tinker Papers. General Collection, Beinecke Rare Book and Manuscript Library, Yale University.

Yale University alumni
Yale Sterling Professors
People from Auburn, Maine
1876 births
1963 deaths
James Boswell
American academics of English literature
Members of the American Academy of Arts and Letters